Yuri K. Kataev (January 6, 1932 – July 5, 2011) - the Soviet muralist, painter and sculptor, a member of the Union of Russian Artists.

Biography 
Born January 6, 1932 in the city of Rubtsovsk West Siberian Region (now - Altai Territory).

Died July 5, 2011 in Novosibirsk.

Muralist, sculptor, ceramist, designer and painter. YURI kata - a member of the Union of Artists.

In the history of Siberian art Yuri Kataev came primarily as a muralist. He created a large number of monumental works for the city of Novosibirsk and the region: relief song "Novosibirsk" metro station "area of Garin-Mikhailovsky" (1986), a comprehensive interior design Novosibirsk Youth Theater (1983), the complex design of the station in the station Postyshevo (BAM): - bust PP Postysheva multi sculptures from the facades and heraldic composition with the clock on the facade (1982), a comprehensive design and decoration of the pavilion suburban banks station Novosibirsk-main (1980), architectural decoration pioneer camp "Sibtekstilmash" plant (1974), interior decoration and façade station to station "Altai" (1974), carried out projects of interiors Tu-144, the railway station in the city of Pavlodar, DC "Manpower reserves", a concert hall in the city of Novosibirsk. Since 1963, he participated in the provincial, regional, national and international exhibitions.

Painter wide creative range, Yuri Kataev received an excellent education: in the 1950s, he graduated with honors from the Almaty Art School, class of painting, and then - Leningrad Higher Industrial Art School named after Mukhina. In 1961, at the invitation of the Union of Artists of Novosibirsk Kataev he arrived in Novosibirsk, where he spent his entire creative life. The pupil of the Russian classical school of realism, he has incorporated its best traditions.

For many years, was elected to the governing bodies of the organizations of the Novosibirsk Union of Artists, the board of the Union of Artists and the exhibition committee.

Achievements 
Awards JK Kataeva
 He was awarded the Diploma of Honour of the Executive Committee of the Novosibirsk City Council of People's Deputies for participation in the I zonal exhibition "Siberia socialist" (1964)
 Certificate of Merit of the Novosibirsk branch of the Art Fund of the RSFSR,
 Letter of the Secretariat of the Board of Union of Artists of the USSR (1967)
 Certificate of Merit of the Secretariat of the Board of the RSFSR Union of Artists (1967)
 Badge of the Ministry of Culture of the RSFSR "For active participation in the cultural service of the builders of BAM"
 Diploma of I degree of the RSFSR Union of Architects (1984)
 Diploma of Siberian second contest in the field of urban planning, architecture and design "Golden capital" (1997);
 I place in the competition for the best project of the monument to the architect AD Kryachkova.
 Winner of the Governor of the Novosibirsk Region in the field of literature and art (2003)
 (The funds of the Novosibirsk Art Museum and the permanent exhibition are stored for 7 art paintings work Kataeva ( "Workaholic-Ob", "Ob gave", "Stoker Rechflot", "buoy keeper on the Ob ',' A Irtysh", "berth", " village marina "as well as a sculptural portrait of the artist Chernobrovtseva, outdoor decorative vase" Rooster "(ceramics, schamot))

List of works

References and sources

1935 births
2011 deaths
20th-century Russian painters
Russian male painters
Russian male essayists
Russian illustrators
Russian memoirists
Russian realist painters
Soviet realist painters
Muralists
20th-century Russian male artists